Myrna Emile Bustani (born 20 December 1937) is a Lebanese businesswoman, philanthropist, socialite and former parliamentarian. Daughter of Emile Bustani, she was the first woman to serve in the Lebanese parliament (1963-1964) after she took charge of representing her father's parliament seat upon his death in 1963.
Bustani is a big contributor towards cultural events in Lebanon and a patron of the arts. She is a chairperson of the Al Bustan International Festival in Lebanon.

Biography

Early life

Myrna Bustani was born in Beirut on December 20, 1937 to Emile and Laura Bustani. Her parents courted at the Grand Hotel in Beit Mery during the 1930s prior to their marriage. Emille would years later buy the same building in auction, that would later be transformed into the Al Bustan hotel. 
Her father Emile Bustani headed the leading engineering and contracting firm in the Arab world and was a prominent Lebanese statesman.
Bustani's mother Laura, was an accomplished choir singer and pianist and instilled in Myrna a passion for classical compositions. Laura Bustani would take her two children to see concerts frequently in Beirut during their youth.

Education

Myrna Bustani attended Collège Protestant Français and in addition for 10 years received formal piano lessons from in Beirut. 
Bustani attended a finishing school in London and completed her training there in 1954. 
She studied at  the University of Lyon in France, where she graduated in 1958 with a BSc degree in Psychology. 
Aside from her native Lebanese Arabic, Bustani is also fluent in French and English.

Career

Politics
In 1963, her father Emile Bustani  died in an airplane crash. He was considered to be one of the most influential businessmen and philanthropists in the Middle East and a leading figure in the politics of the region at the time. He had been a member of the Lebanese parliament since 1951 Upon his death, Myrna Bustani had been elected to succeed him and thus became the first woman to serve in the Lebanese parliament.

Business
After her father's death, Myrna Bustani not only inherited his parliament seat but also his business positions at various companies and other responsibilities. Including project plans.

Al Bustan Hotel

Prior to his death Emile Bustani had purchased the former hotel where he and his wife use to go dancing before they married during the 1930s. He had bought the building with the intention to developing it.
In order for redevelopment to happen they needed to demolish the old hotel. Construction for the new hotel started in 1962. Emile died before its completion. However, his wife and daughter continued the development of the project.

By 1967, the hotel was officially completed and ready for its grand opening. Myrna's mother chose the name "Al Bustan" (The Garden) – it was the first hotel of the time to take an Arabic name, when Beirut’s hotels all took European names. The Al Bustan would become an important Lebanese landmark.

Philanthropy
In 1985, she established the Emile Bustani Middle East Seminar at her father's American alma mater, MIT, to honour his memory and pursue his devotion to higher education and peace in the region. Bustani has been a member of the AUB Board of Trustees since 1979.

Patron of the Arts
In 2007, according to an interview she did for Bespoke Magazine (online publication), she described her greatest calling is the struggle to revitalize and educate her sceptical countrymen about symphonies and sonatas, despite rampant economic instability, political assassinations and general unrest.

In 1993, she setup the Al Bustan Festival, since it was launched the festival has welcomed hundreds of local and international musicians and performers.<ref>Al-Bustan fest is back and bigger than ever albawaba.com Retrieved 21 July 2017</ref>

AwardsOrder of the Cedar, (officer), LebanonMerite Culturel, Ministry of Arts of The Polish RepublicGolden Insignia of the Republic of AustriaCommander of the Isabel la Catholique'', Spain

References

1937 births
Living people
Lebanese socialites
Businesspeople from Beirut
Lebanese philanthropists
Lebanese Maronites
Lebanese women in politics
Lebanese women in business
Recipients of the Order of Isabella the Catholic
Members of the Parliament of Lebanon
Politicians from Beirut